Persoff is a surname. Notable people with the surname include:

Ethan Persoff (born 1974), American cartoonist, archivist, and sound artist
Nehemiah Persoff (1919-2022), American character actor and painter

See also
Perloff
Peroff